Rafael Faustino Gómez (born 27 December 1967) is an Argentine professional golfer.

Career
Gómez was born in Buenos Aires. He turned professional in 1990. He played on the European Challenge Tour in 2003 and from 2005 to 2007 and the European Tour from 2005 to 2007. He played on the U.S.-based Nationwide Tour in 2004 and a few events on the PGA Tour. His best finish on the PGA Tour was 38th place in The International in 2002. His best finish on the European Tour was 22nd place in the KLM Open in 2006.

Gómez won the TPG Tour Order of Merit in 2007 and the Tour de las Americas Order of Merit in 2001/02 and 2004. He was second in Los Encinos Open in 2002, Mexican Open in 2006 and the Colombian Open in 2008. Gómez and Ángel Cabrera have the most tournament wins on the Tour de las Americas with eight victories.

Gómez won the 2018 European Senior Tour qualifying school and currently plays on that tour. He finished runner-up in the 2018 Senior Italian Open, losing in a playoff to American Clark Dennis.

Professional wins (29)

Challenge Tour wins (2)

1Co-sanctioned by the Tour de las Américas

Canadian Tour wins (2)

1Co-sanctioned by the Tour de las Américas

Tour de las Américas wins (11)
 1997 Cali Open (Colombia), Farallones Open (Colombia) (this year South American Tour)
 2001 Viña del Mar Open (Chile)
 2002 Caribbean Open (Bahamas), American Express Costa Rica Open
 2003 Caribbean Open (Bahamas)
 2004 Abierto Mexicano de Golf (co-sanctioned with the Challenge Tour)
 2006 San Luis Open (Argentina)
 2008 TLA Players Championship (Mexico), San Luis Open (co-sanctioned by the TPG Tour), Sport Frances Open (Chile) (co-sanctioned by the Canadian Tour)

TPG Tour wins (10)

1Co-sanctioned by the Tour de las Américas

Other Argentine wins (5)
 1996 La Orquidea Grand Prix
 1997 JPGA Championship
 1998 Norpatagonico Open
 2005 Pinamar Open
 2008 Jose Jurado Grand Prix

Other wins (2)
 1997 Wizz Cup (Colombia)
 1999 Serrezuela Open (Colombia)

Playoff record
European Senior Tour playoff record (0–1)

Results in senior major championships

"T" indicates a tie for a place
CUT = missed the halfway cut
NT = No tournament due to COVID-19 pandemic

See also
 2005 Challenge Tour graduates

References

External links

Argentine male golfers
PGA Tour golfers
PGA Tour Latinoamérica golfers
European Tour golfers
Sportspeople from Buenos Aires
1967 births
Living people